Promecognathus is a genus of ground beetles in the family Carabidae. There are at least two described species in Promecognathus. Both species of Promecognathus are known to predate upon Xystocheir dissecta, which is a species of flat-backed millipede that produces cyanide as a chemical defense. The beetles do not avoid exposure to the defense, meaning they are likely physically resistant to cyanide.

Species
These two species belong to the genus Promecognathus:
 Promecognathus crassus LeConte, 1868
 Promecognathus laevissimus (Dejean, 1829)

References

Further reading

External links

 

Scaritinae
Articles created by Qbugbot